KMNO (91.7 FM) is a community radio station licensed to Wailuku, Hawaii. The station is owned by Maui Media Initiative, Inc. It airs a variety radio format.

The station was assigned the KMNO call letters by the Federal Communications Commission on August 1, 2012.

References

External links
 Official Website
 

MNO
Radio stations established in 2014
Community radio stations in the United States
Variety radio stations in the United States
2014 establishments in Hawaii
Maui County, Hawaii